The 2017–18 season was the 88th season in the existence of Stade de Reims and the club's second consecutive season in the second division of French football. In addition to the domestic league, Reims participated in this season's editions of the Coupe de France and the Coupe de la Ligue.

Players

First-team squad 
As of 27 February 2018.

Out on loan

Transfers

In

Out

Pre-season and friendlies

Competitions

Overview

Ligue 2

League table

Results summary

Results by round

Matches

Coupe de France

Coupe de la Ligue

References

Stade de Reims seasons
Stade de Reims